Mlynčeky is a village and municipality in Kežmarok District in the Prešov Region of north Slovakia.

Geography
The municipality lies at an altitude of 680 metres and covers an area of 7.679 km² . It has a population of about 620 people.

History
The village itself was established in 1956. At the end of 18th century was just one watermill located at the place of present village. Afterwards a pub had been constructed. Then the Mlynčeky became a settlement and in 1956 it obtained village status.

External links
http://www.statistics.sk/mosmis/eng/run.html
http://www.mlynceky.sk/

Villages and municipalities in Kežmarok District